Hertme is a village in the Dutch province of Overijssel. It is a part of the municipality of Borne, and lies about 7 km north of Hengelo.

Hertme has its own church. There is a restaurant called 'Hertme’s Ambacht'. It has its own music club, school and hotel. The school is called St. Aegidius school, it has roughly 80 pupils.

The Open Air Theater, built in 1955 for the local passion plays, has been the site of an annual African Music Festival since 1990. The Afrikafestival Hertme Youtube channel had 468,000 subscribers in 2020.

Gallery

References

Populated places in Overijssel
Borne, Overijssel